Télie Mathiot (born 25 May 1987 at Dijon) is a French athlete who specializes in pole vaulting.

Career 
In 2010, Télie Mathiot became French Pole Vault Champion at the 122nd French championships at Valence.  After beating her personal best by vaulting 4.41 m at Saran on 3 June 2011 in the championships of France FFSU, she then competed at the European Team Championships at Stockholm where she finished 8th with a vault of 4.25 m.

Prize list

Records 
 4.41 m outdoors at Saran on 4 June 2011.   
 4.34 m indoors at Cassis on 26 March 2011.

External links  
 

1987 births
Living people
French female pole vaulters
Sportspeople from Dijon
20th-century French women
21st-century French women